National Highway 227L, commonly referred to as NH 227L is a national highway in India. It is a secondary route of National Highway 27.  NH-227L runs in the state of Bihar in India.

Route 
NH227L connects Umagaon, Basopatti and Kaluvahi  in the state of Bihar.

Junctions  
 
  Terminal near Umagaon.
  Terminal near Kalnahi.

See also 
 List of National Highways in India
 List of National Highways in India by state

References

External links 

 NH 227L on OpenStreetMap

National highways in India
National Highways in Bihar